Citrus Springs is a census-designated place (CDP) in Citrus County, Florida, United States. The population was 8,622 as of the 2010 census, up from 4,157 in 2000.

Geography
Citrus Springs is located in northern Citrus County at  (28.993539, -82.461692). It is bordered by Pine Ridge to the south and Hernando to the east. U.S. Route 41 (North Florida Avenue) runs through the CDP, leading southeast  to Inverness, the Citrus County seat, and north  to Dunnellon in Marion County.

Demographics

As of the census of 2000, there were 4,157 people, 1,834 households, and 1,333 families residing in the CDP. The racial makeup of the CDP was 93.70% White, 2.24% African American, 0.31% Native American, 0.65% Asian, 0.07% Pacific Islander, 1.37% from other races, and 1.66% from two or more races. Hispanic or Latino of any race were 5.46% of the population.

There were 1,834 households, out of which 20.1% had children under the age of 18 living with them, 62.4% were married couples living together, 8.5% had a female householder with no husband present, and 27.3% were non-families. 23.3% of all households were made up of individuals, and 16.4% had someone living alone who was 65 years of age or older. The average household size was 2.25 and the average family size was 2.61.

In the CDP, the population was spread out, with 18.0% under the age of 18, 4.2% from 18 to 24, 18.6% from 25 to 44, 22.9% from 45 to 64, and 36.3% who were 65 years of age or older. The median age was 54 years. For every 100 females, there were 88.4 males. For every 100 females age 18 and over, there were 85.8 males.

The median income for a household in the CDP was $29,758, and the median income for a family was $35,000. Males had a median income of $27,143 versus $18,686 for females. The per capita income for the CDP was $16,845. About 5.0% of families and 7.8% of the population were below the poverty line, including 11.4% of those under age 18 and 4.1% of those age 65 or over.

History
Citrus Springs was developed by the Mackle Brothers, prominent Florida real estate developers working under The Deltona Corporation to be used as a subdivision consisting of over 34,000 homesites. (Elkcam Boulevard, a prominent street in Citrus Springs, is "Mackle" spelled backwards.) The area currently has two elementary schools (Citrus Springs Elementary School and Central Ridge Elementary School, opened fall 2008) and one middle school (Citrus Springs Middle School).

Phosphate mining played a major part in the history of Citrus County until the end of World War II, when phosphate mining largely moved overseas. The first newspaper of Citrus County was called the Phosphate Times. Many abandoned mines exist in the Withlacoochee River basin, with a concentration of those within Citrus Springs. Some of those areas can be seen at one of Citrus Springs' two golf courses, El Diablo. Many of those mines were part of the Dunnellon Phosphate company, headed by Capt John L. Inglis, a veteran of the Civil War. Areas in northeastern Citrus Springs were part of a proposed but unbuilt portion of the Cross Florida Barge Canal to aid the transportation of the mineral.

The Withlacoochee State Trail, a  bike riding trail which was converted from the railroad lines built in the early 1900s, runs through Citrus Springs, in places parallel to US 41.

Education
The CDP is served by Citrus County Schools. Residents are divided between Citrus Springs Elementary and Central Ridge Elementary. All residents are zoned to Citrus Springs Middle School. Portions of the CDP are zoned to Citrus High School, Crystal River High School, and Lecanto High School.

References

External links
Citrus County Visitors & Convention Bureau
Citrus Springs Civic Association directory

Census-designated places in Citrus County, Florida
Census-designated places in Florida